The 2003 Stanley Cup Finals was the championship series of the National Hockey League's (NHL) 2002–03 season, and the culmination of the 2003 Stanley Cup playoffs. The second-seeded Eastern Conference champion New Jersey Devils defeated the seventh-seeded Western Conference champion Mighty Ducks of Anaheim in seven games and were awarded the Stanley Cup for the third time in franchise history. It was New Jersey's first appearance since 2001 and third in four years. It was Anaheim's first-ever appearance. The Devils defeated the Mighty Ducks in seven games to win their third Stanley Cup in less than a decade. For the first time since 1965, all seven games were won by the home team. To date this is the last Stanley Cup Finals in which this happened.

The Devils' win was the last in a series of wins they, along with the Colorado Avalanche and the Detroit Red Wings, established in the era from 1995 to 2003. The three teams won a combined eight of nine Stanley Cups during that time. The Devils won in 1995, followed by the Avalanche in 1996, then the Red Wings in 1997 and 1998. The Dallas Stars win in 1999 would be superseded by the Devils in 2000, Colorado in 2001 and Detroit in 2002.

Paths to the Finals

The New Jersey Devils were in the Stanley Cup Finals for their fourth time in franchise history, as well as their third appearance in four years. En route to the finals, New Jersey defeated the Boston Bruins and Tampa Bay Lightning in five games, and the Ottawa Senators in the Eastern Conference Finals in a seven-game series. Strong goaltending from future Hockey Hall of Fame goaltender Martin Brodeur, and strong defense from future Hockey Hall of Fame captain Scott Stevens and future Hockey Hall of Fame defenseman Scott Niedermayer led the Devils to the finals. Niedermayer and forward Jamie Langenbrunner led all NHL players in points during the entire playoffs. Forwards John Madden and Jeff Friesen, the latter of whom had been traded to New Jersey from Anaheim during the off-season, also finished among the top scorers in the league during the playoffs.

The Mighty Ducks of Anaheim entered their first Stanley Cup Finals in franchise history after upsetting two heavily favored teams: sweeping the defending Stanley Cup champion Detroit Red Wings and defeating the Dallas Stars in six games. Anaheim also swept the Minnesota Wild in the Western Conference Finals, largely due to the stellar goaltending of Jean-Sebastien Giguere, who only allowed one goal during the entire series. Supporting Giguere were future Hockey Hall of Fame members Paul Kariya and Adam Oates as well as forwards Petr Sykora and Rob Niedermayer, brother of then-Devils star defenseman Scott Niedermayer.

This series was considered memorable as two brothers on different teams competed against one another for the Stanley Cup. Carol Niedermayer, the mother of Rob and Scott, said she hoped Rob would win because Scott had already won Stanley Cups in 1995 and 2000. Scott said of his mother's statement: "That made sense to me."

Game summaries
The 2003 Stanley Cup Finals pitted the second-seeded Eastern Conference champion New Jersey Devils against the seventh-seeded Western Conference champion Mighty Ducks of Anaheim. The Devils, who finished the season with 108 points, defeated the Mighty Ducks in seven games to win the Stanley Cup. The series opened at Continental Airlines Arena in East Rutherford, New Jersey.

Game one
In game one Martin Brodeur kept the Ducks off the scoreboard while the Devils players continually dominated the Ducks. Sergei Brylin scored the winning goal in the second period and the Devils went on to shut out the Mighty Ducks 3–0.

Game two
In a virtual repeat of game one, Patrik Elias scored the winning goal in the second period and the Devils shut out Anaheim 3–0 again.

Game three
Down 2–0 after two games, the series shifted to the Arrowhead Pond of Anaheim in Southern California. Game three was remembered for the clumsy mistake from Martin Brodeur when he accidentally dropped his stick when the puck came to him; the puck deflected off his fallen stick and into the net to give the Ducks a lucky break and a 2–1 lead. The Devils would later tie the game, only to lose in overtime. Over the mistake with his stick, Brodeur later claimed, "It was just one of those once in a lifetime things."

Game four
Game four had no scoring throughout regulation and was a battle between goaltenders Brodeur and Giguere. But Anaheim again came out on top in overtime, winning 1–0 and tying the series 2–2.

Game five
Game five, returning to the Meadowlands, saw a continual battle for the first half of the game. With the game tied 3–3 in the second period, the Devils took the lead with a deflection goal by Jay Pandolfo that was initially waved off by referees due to an apparent kicking motion with the skates. Video replays, however, showed that there was no distinct kicking motion from the skates, and thus the referees' call was reversed, resulting in a goal. This would prove to deflate the Ducks for the rest of the game, as Jamie Langenbrunner scored two more goals for the Devils to give New Jersey a 6–3 win and a three games to two series lead.

Game six
With New Jersey looking to clinch the series, game six in Anaheim saw the Mighty Ducks return the favor of game five to the Devils with complete dominance throughout the game. Quite possibly the most remembered moment of the entire series came when the Ducks were winning 3–1 in the second period. Ducks captain Paul Kariya failed to see Devils captain Scott Stevens approaching after he passed the puck, and he was subsequently checked by the defensemen in a hit similar to the check that knocked out Eric Lindros during the 2000 playoffs and caused Lindros to miss the next season. Kariya was lying motionless for a few minutes, where he was then escorted to the locker room. Kariya, however, unexpectedly returned to the bench minutes later. About 11 minutes after the hit, Kariya fired a slap shot that found the back of the net. This helped the Ducks win the game 5–2 and sent the series to a seventh and final game.

Game seven
Game seven in New Jersey saw the Devils once more completely dominate the Ducks. The game-winning goal was scored by Michael Rupp. Rupp became the first player in Stanley Cup history to have his first playoff goal be the Stanley Cup winner. Additionally, Jeff Friesen dominated his former Mighty Duck teammates, scoring the game's final two goals to solidify the victory. The 3–0 win gave the Devils their third Stanley Cup victory, as Anaheim cannot complete their Cinderella run. The Mighty Ducks, however, didn't leave empty-handed; for his stellar play throughout the playoffs and Finals, goaltender Jean-Sebastien Giguere was awarded the Conn Smythe Trophy as the most valuable player (MVP) of the playoffs. He became only the fifth player, and fourth goaltender, in NHL history to have won the trophy as a member of the losing team, joining Detroit's Roger Crozier, the St. Louis Blues' Glenn Hall, and the Philadelphia Flyers' Reggie Leach (a right winger) and Ron Hextall. He is also the most recent such Smythe winner to date.

Team rosters
Years indicated in boldface under the "Finals appearance" column signify that the player won the Stanley Cup in the given year.

Mighty Ducks of Anaheim

New Jersey Devils

Stanley Cup engraving
The 2003 Stanley Cup was presented to Devils captain Scott Stevens by NHL Commissioner Gary Bettman following the Devils 3–0 win over the Mighty Ducks in game seven

The following Devils players and staff had their names engraved on the Stanley Cup

2002–03 New Jersey Devils

Three Stanley Cups with New Jersey

New Jersey won three Stanley Cups in short succession: 1995, 2000 and 2003. These players and staff were members of all three Stanley Cup Championships.

Martin Brodeur, Sergei Brylin, Ken Daneyko, Scott Niedermayer, Scott Stevens, Bobby Carpenter Jr. (one as a player, two as an assistant coach), Lou Lamoriello, Larry Robinson, Jacques Caron, Claude Carrier, David Conte, Milt Fisher, Dan Labraaten, Marcel Provonost, Mike Vasalani, Peter McMullen (left Cup in 2003).

Broadcasting
In the United States, the Disney-owned networks ESPN and ABC aired the Finals. Gary Thorne, and Bill Clement called the entire series, with John Davidson joining them for the ABC games. ESPN aired the first two games while ABC broadcast the rest of the series.

In Canada, Bob Cole and Harry Neale were in the broadcast booth for CBC. One of the CBC's owned and operated Station's in New Brunswick (CBAT-TV) decided to preempt game seven of the Final in order to broadcast the New Brunswick general election returns. This would also be the first finals televised by RDS, replacing SRC as the Canadian French-language broadcaster.

For the radio coverage, Devils team broadcaster John Hennessy called the series on WABC–AM 770 in New York City. In Anaheim, Steve Carroll called the series.

Quotes

References

 
Stanley Cup
Anaheim Ducks games
New Jersey Devils games
Stanley Cup Finals
Stanley Cup Finals
Stanley Cup Finals
21st century in Anaheim, California
Sports competitions in East Rutherford, New Jersey
21st century in East Rutherford, New Jersey
Stanley Cup Finals
Stanley Cup Finals
Sports competitions in Anaheim, California
Ice hockey competitions in New Jersey